Hugo Horn (born 9 May 1977 in Mariental, South-West Africa) is a Namibian rugby union player. He plays as a hooker.

Horn currently plays for Rotherham Titans in the RFU Championship in England. He was an international player for Namibia. He played at the 1999 Rugby World Cup, in all the three games, and at the 2007 Rugby World Cup, in all the four games. He was also originally called up for Namibia's 2003 Rugby World Cup, but playing professional rugby in South Africa, pulled out due to financial reasons.

References

1977 births
Living people
People from Hardap Region
Namibian rugby union players
Rotherham Titans players
Rugby union hookers
Namibian expatriate rugby union players
Expatriate rugby union players in England
Expatriate rugby union players in South Africa
Namibian expatriate sportspeople in South Africa
Namibian expatriate sportspeople in England
Namibia international rugby union players